Zelenivka is an urban-type settlement in Kherson Raion, Kherson Oblast, southern Ukraine. Zelenivka belongs to Kherson urban hromada, one of the hromadas of Ukraine. It has a population of

Administrative status 
Until 18 July, 2020, Zelenivka belonged to Kherson Municipality. The municipality as an administrative unit was abolished in July 2020 as part of the administrative reform of Ukraine, which reduced the number of raions of Kherson Oblast to five. The area of Kherson Municipality was merged into Kherson Raion.

Economy

Transportation
There is infrequent passenger traffic.

The settlement has road access to Kherson, as well as to Highway M14, which connects Kherson with Mykolaiv and Melitopol.

See also 

 Russian occupation of Kherson Oblast

References

Urban-type settlements in Kherson Raion